Syllable Desktop is a discontinued free and open-source operating system for Pentium and compatible processors. Its purpose is to create an easy-to-use desktop operating system for the home and small office user. It was forked from the stagnant AtheOS in July 2002.

It has a native web browser (Webster, which is WebKit-based), email client (Whisper), media player, IDE, and many more applications.

Another version of Syllable OS is the Syllable Server, which is based on Linux core.

Features 
Features according to the official website include:
 Native 64-bit journaled file system, the AtheOS File System (usually abbreviated to AFS in this context; not to be confused with the Andrew File System which shares the same abbreviation)
 C++ oriented API
 Object-oriented graphical desktop environment on a native GUI architecture
 Mostly POSIX compliant
 Software ports, including Vim, Perl, Python, Apache, others.
 GNU toolchain (GCC, Glibc, Binutils, Make)
 Preemptive multitasking with multithreading
 Symmetric multiprocessing (multiple processor) support
 Device drivers for most common hardware (video, sound, network chips)
 File system drivers for FAT (read/write), NTFS (read) and ext2 (read)
 Rebol as system scripting language

See also

 Haiku (operating system)

References

Further reading
 Michael Saunders (2 August 2004) Syllable - The Little OS with a Big Future, OSNews
 Jeff Park (23 August 2006) Syllable: A different open source OS, Linux.com
 Rohan Pearce (30 August 2011) Developer Q&A: Syllable OS, Techworld
 
 
 Linux Format 78 (April 2006)
 Linux Format 105 (May 2008)

External links

 

Free software operating systems
Hobbyist operating systems
Unix variants
X86 operating systems
Software using the GPL license